The Footy Show may refer to the following television programs:

 The Footy Show (AFL), Australian rules football show 1994–2019
 The Footy Show (rugby league), Australian rugby league show 1994–2018
 The Footy Show (1957 TV program), Australian sports television program